Nikto, Krome Nas… is a 2008 Russian war film directed by Sergey Govorukhin. It depicts a romantic relationship between two people during the Russian intervention in the Tajikistani Civil War.

Cast 
Sergey Shnyryov	
Sergey Makhovikov
Mariya Mironova					
Yury Belyayev		
Rafael Akhmetshin
Lyudmila Titova		
Sergey Sazontev
Irina Brazgovka			
Anatoliy Belyy
Vasili Gorbachyov
Private Cheklin
Anton Khabarov
Kapitan Istratov

References

External links

2008 films
2000s war drama films
Russian war drama films
Films directed by Vittorio Cottafavi
2000s Russian-language films
Films set in the 20th century